The 1979 President's Cup Football Tournament was the ninth competition of Korea Cup. It was held from 8 to 21 September 1979, and was won by a Brazilian club Vitória-ES for the first time, who defeated South Korea in the final.

Group stage

Group A

Group B

Knockout stage

Bracket

Semi-finals

Third place play-off

Final

See also
Korea Cup
South Korea national football team results

References

External links
President's Cup 1979 (South Korea) at RSSSF

1979